The Darling Buds are an alternative rock band from Newport, South Wales. The band formed in 1986 and were named after the H. E. Bates novel The Darling Buds of May – a title taken in turn, from the third line of Shakespeare's Sonnet 18: "Rough winds do shake the darling buds of May".

Career
Influenced by the catchy simple sound of the early Beatles as well as that of Blondie, the band created melodic, hook-driven, short-duration singles. They were considered part of the short lived "Blonde" movement (indie rock band fronted by blonde female singer with all other members being dark-haired males) along with the likes of The Primitives and Transvision Vamp, but also referenced the C86 scene of a few years earlier.

The Darling Buds formed in Caerleon near Newport, South Wales, in 1986 by 19-year-old Andrea Lewis, billed simply as "Andrea". Rounding out the original line-up was guitarist Geraint Farr, billed as "Harley", and a bassist known simply as Simon.  The drumming was originally performed by a drum machine.  The group's debut single, "If I Said", was self-released in February 1987 and was well received. The group re-released the single on an established label, Native Records, receiving radio play on John Peel's BBC Radio 1 show. The line-up was then re-organized, with Andrea and Harley being joined by new bassist Chris McDonagh and drummer Richard Gray (billed as "Bloss").  

Signing with Sony in 1988, several singles preceded the band's critically acclaimed 1989 debut LP, Pop Said....  The album, described as "relentlessly chirpy", ultimately reached the Top 30 in the UK Albums Chart, and the band appeared on Top of the Pops as well as the cover of Melody Maker twice (24 September 1988 and 18 February 1989). In 1990, drummer Bloss left the band and was replaced by Jimmy Hughes from Black.  Their second album, Crawdaddy, was not as well received, even if, according to critic Doug Brod, it "reveal[ed] a more mature Buds, a group that has learned the value of a little variety."

Pressing forward with their new style, the group followed with their third and final album in 1992, entitled Erotica, a few weeks before Madonna's album of the same name. The album contained the US single, "Long Day in the Universe", which was featured on the soundtrack for the Mike Myers film, So I Married an Axe Murderer.  Shortly after the album was completed, drummer Hughes left and was briefly replaced by Jon Lee (who drummed on two non-LP b-sides), then by drummer Dennis McCarthy.  Around the same time, the group added second guitarist Matt Gray (ex-Soldier Dolls) to the line up. Although they toured the United States in support of the album for a year, the members of the Darling Buds grew increasingly frustrated by their lack of commercial success and disbanded. Speaking to the Q Magazine in 2012, Lewis explained the reasons behind their decision: "Sony's London office wanted to pass the financial buck after we'd moved to LA and the bureaucracy meant we couldn't tour or record. We got stuck in limbo for ages and eventually called it a day."

Post break-up
Since disbanding, Andrea Lewis Jarvis (as she is now known) moved on to acting, touring with a Cardiff theatre company. She later moved into presenting, hosting The Slate for BBC Wales and, in 1998 and 1999, she co-hosted a Welsh Saturday morning radio show, The Weekenders, with Gareth Jones. Andrea, alongside husband Jamie Jarvis, now runs her own theatre school called "CAST" (The Children's Academy of Stage Training), based in Cardiff, Caerleon and Monmouth. Chris McDonagh now works at Le Mons studio in Newport. Richard 'Bloss' Gray became an assistant manager in a hotel near Cardiff; as of 2012 he ran the Red Lion Inn in Cowbridge. Geraint 'Harley' Farr, Andrea Lewis' boyfriend during the band's early years, retrained as a dietician/nutritionist and moved to Bristol. "I don't know why, but he's turned his back on that part of his life," commented Lewis on Farr's refusal to join her for a one-off reunion.

In July 2010, the Darling Buds with only Andrea Lewis Jarvis from the original line-up, reformed for a one-off tribute concert in their native Newport in memory of John Sicolo, the owner of the music venue TJ's who died earlier in the year.

In October 2013 the band announced a further show, at the Borderline in London in April 2014, with Chris McDonagh and Matt Gray joining Lewis, to be proceeded by a warm up show at the Le Pub venue in Newport the day before. The band announced the London show would be the last, however, the significant interest in this show, led to the band agreeing to play the Indie Daze festival at the Kentish Town Forum in September 2014, and two headline shows at London's Lexington in April 2015.

With the line-up officially expanded to a quintet of Andrea Lewis Jarvis (vocals), Chris McDonagh (bass), Matt Gray (guitar), Paul 'Chaz' Watkins (guitar, keyboards), and Erik Stams (drums), The Darling Buds released the Evergreen EP  on Oddbox Records on 28 April 2017.  It was their first new material in 25 years.  

Chris McDonagh decided to leave the band in the summer of 2018. Dave Corten replaced him on bass, and the group issued a digital-only single, "New Year", on 15 December 2018.

The band have continued to play live around the country and are currently working toward recording new material.

Members
Andrea Lewis Jarvis – vocals
Matt Gray – guitar (1992–1993, 2010, 2013–present)
Paul "Chaz" Watkins – guitar (1992–1993, 2010, 2013 to present)
Erik Stams – drums (2010 to present)
Dave Corten – bass guitar (2018–present)
Former members
Simon – bass guitar (1986)
Geraint "Harley" Farr – guitar (1986–1993)
Richard "Bloss" Gray – drums (1986–1990)
Jimmy Hughes – drums (1990–1993)
Jon Lee – drums (1992– two of the B-sides on "Sure Thing"; later of the band Feeder)
Dennis McCarthy – drums (1993)
Chris McDonagh – bass guitar (1986–2018)

Discography

Albums
Pop Said... (1989) No. 23 (UK) [reissued 2006 with extra tracks]
Crawdaddy (1990)
Erotica (1992)

Compilations
Shame on You (The Native Years) (1990)

Singles

Flexi Disc
"Spin" (1987 – So Naive fanzine – shared release with Bubblegum Splash!)

References

External links
 Biography from BBC Wales
 Biography and Discography

People from Caerleon
Welsh alternative rock groups
British indie pop groups
British indie rock groups
Musical groups from Newport, Wales